WAPI (1070 kHz, "Talk 99-5, Birmingham's Real Talk") is a commercial AM radio station in Birmingham, Alabama.  It is owned by Cumulus Media and carries a talk radio format, simulcast with FM sister station 99.5 WZRR.  The radio studios and offices are on Goodwin Crest Drive in Homewood.

WAPI and WZRR carry local talk shows during the day, but at night they run nationally syndicated shows from Cumulus subsidiary Westwood One including Mark Levin, Ben Shapiro, Dan Bongino, Red Eye Radio and First Light.  Most hours begin with world and national news from ABC News Radio.  WAPI and WZRR are also Central Alabama's radio home for Auburn Tigers athletics.

WAPI broadcasts using HD Radio technology.  The transmitter is located in Forestdale.  WAPI's daytime power is 50,000 watts, non-directional, the maximum power for AM stations permitted by the Federal Communications Commission.  Because AM 1070 is a clear channel frequency reserved for Class A KNX Los Angeles, WAPI must reduce power at night to 5,000 watts, using a directional antenna, as a Class B station.

History

WSY and WMAV
In April 1922, WSY signed on as the second radio station in Alabama, owned by Alabama Power Company. Informally WSY stood for "We Serve You". Some five months later, the fourth radio station in the state, WMAV, owned by the Alabama Polytechnic Institute (now Auburn University) began broadcasting from Auburn. WSY was successful, but in 1925 Alabama Power decided to get out of the entertainment business.

The broadcast facilities were dismantled and donated to Auburn. At that time, the station's call letters were changed to WAPI, reflecting the ownership of the station.

WAPI and NBC
In 1928, WAPI returned to Birmingham, in part due to the NBC Red Network's interest in affiliating with a station in Alabama's largest city. In 1929, ownership of the station was split among Alabama Polytechnic, the University of Alabama, and the Alabama College for Women (now the University of Montevallo).  The broadcast power was increased to 5,000 watts.

In 1932, the colleges sold the station to a group of businessmen, doing business as "The Voice of Alabama."  WAPI remained affiliated with NBC until 1940, when it became an affiliate of CBS.

Move to 1070
After sharing its dial position with KVOO in Tulsa, Oklahoma for several years, it moved to its present dial position in 1942. On December 1, 1947, it launched an FM sister station, WAFM.  For a time, it used the call sign WAPI-FM and is now 94.5 WJOX-FM. In 1949, WAPI launched the first television station in Alabama, WAFM-TV (now WVTM-TV). The Birmingham News purchased WAPI and its FM and television sister stations in 1953, and in 1954, the by-then WABT re-affiliated with NBC; the TV station assumed the WAPI calls in 1958. The Newhouse chain bought The Birmingham News in 1956, and sold off the broadcast outlets to separate owners in 1980, at which time the TV station acquired its current callsign.

Popular Music and Adult Standards
In the 1950s, as network radio programming began to lose its importance due to television's popularity, WAPI 1070 evolved.  It became a full service, middle-of-the-road station of popular music, news and sports, featuring several local call-in shows at night. By the mid-1970s, it was the only Birmingham AM adult contemporary radio station.

In July 1983, WAPI changed to an adult standards format under the branding "Hit Parade". In January 1985, the station returned to its previous adult contemporary format. However, three months later, WAPI immediately returned to adult standards programming when crosstown rival WSGN (now WAGG) dropped that format. On January 1, 1996, WAPI became an all-news radio station. Since that time, the station has evolved into a mostly talk radio station.

AM-FM Simulcast
On February 22, 2010, WWMM-FM (100.5) changed its call sign to WAPI-FM and dropped its former adult album alternative music format. The two stations began simulcasting for most of the day, with the FM side branded as the main station, calling itself "100 WAPI." However, on July 24, 2013, WAPI-FM changed its call letters to WJQX and flipped to ESPN Radio as a sister station to WJOX and WJOX-FM.  This left the news/talk format solely on the AM side once again for three years.

On May 23, 2016, co-owned 99.5 WZRR dropped its country music format and began simulcasting WAPI. However, WZRR is now branded as the main station.  Both stations began calling themselves "Talk 99.5," without any references to the AM 1070 frequency except for legally mandated station identification).

Transmitter and Towers
Although it boasts the most powerful daytime signal in Alabama, WAPI does not travel as far as most other 50,000-watt stations due to the region's poor ground conductivity.  It does, however, cover all of central Alabama during the day from a single tower, and can be heard as far away as the Atlanta suburbs under the right atmospheric conditions. At night, it cuts back power to 5,000 watts, using a two-tower array.

WAPI employs a directional antenna to protect KNX in Los Angeles, the main station at AM 1070, as well as KYW in Philadelphia at adjacent AM 1060 and former Canadian station CBA in Moncton New Brunswick (although CBA is no longer broadcasting on 1070, the allocation is protected).  This makes WAPI difficult to listen to, outside Birmingham and its close-in suburbs, at night.

Previous logo
 (WAPI's logo prior to simulcast with WAPI-FM)

References

External links
FCC History Cards for WAPI
WAPI official website
Thad Holt was a broadcaster and the founder of WAPI.  His papers can be found at the University of Maryland Libraries

API (AM)
News and talk radio stations in the United States
Radio stations established in 1922
1922 establishments in Alabama
Cumulus Media radio stations
Radio stations licensed before 1923 and still broadcasting